Jacques le Berré (born 21 September 1937) is a French judoka. He competed in the men's middleweight event at the 1964 Summer Olympics.

References

1937 births
Living people
French male judoka
Olympic judoka of France
Judoka at the 1964 Summer Olympics
Place of birth missing (living people)